The diuca finch (Diuca diuca) is a species of bird in the tanager family Thraupidae. It is the only member of the genus Diuca. It is found in Argentina, Bolivia, Brazil, Chile, and Uruguay. Its natural habitats are subtropical or tropical dry shrubland, subtropical or tropical high-altitude shrubland, and heavily degraded former forest.

Taxonomy
The diuca finch was formally described in 1782 by the Chilean naturalist Juan Ignacio Molina under the binomial name Fringilla diuca. The specific epithet is from the Araucano names Diuca or Siuca for this species. With the transfer of the glacier finch (formerly white-winged diuca finch) to Idiopsar or Chionodacryon, the diuca finch is now the only member of the genus Diuca, which was introduced in 1850 by the German naturalist Ludwig Reichenbach.

Four subspecies are recognised:
 D. d. crassirostris Hellmayr, 1932 – north-central Chile, south Bolivia and north Argentina
 D. d. diuca (Molina, 1782) – central, south-central Chile and west Argentina
 D. d. chiloensis Philippi Bañados & Peña, 1964 – Chiloé Island (off southern Chile)
 D. d. minor Bonaparte, 1850 – central, south Argentina and south Chile

References

External links
 Xeno-canto: audio recordings of the common diuca finch
 

diuca finch
Birds of Chile
Birds of Argentina
Birds of the Southern Andes
diuca finch
diuca finch
Taxonomy articles created by Polbot